Martin Mečiar (born 23 July 1993) is a Slovak football defender who currently plays for Slovan Galanta of 3. Liga West, on loan from Fortuna Liga club Orion Tip Sereď.

Club career

ŠKF Sereď
Mečiar made his Fortuna Liga debut for Sereď against Ružomberok on 21 July 2018, in a goal-less tie.

References

External links
 
 
 Futbalnet profile 

1993 births
Living people
Place of birth missing (living people)
Slovak footballers
Association football defenders
FC Spartak Trnava players
MFK Ružomberok players
ŠKF Sereď players
FC Slovan Galanta players
Slovak Super Liga players
2. Liga (Slovakia) players
3. Liga (Slovakia) players